"Second Round K.O." is a single from Canibus' debut album, Can-I-Bus.  The song was produced by Wyclef Jean and his cousin Jerry Wonder and features spoken vocals from boxer Mike Tyson.

The song became Canibus's only top 40 single, peaking at number 28 on the Billboard Hot 100.

Background
"Second Round K.O." is a diss track by Canibus directed at LL Cool J. The feud had started after Canibus' appearance on LL's "4, 3, 2, 1. Canibus' original verse contained the lyrics "L, is that a mic on your arm? Let me borrow that", which LL took offense to. LL responded by writing an indirect diss towards Canibus on the same song. Prior to the song's release, LL approached Canibus and told him that if he wanted to remain on the song, he would have to change his lines, to which Canibus agreed, however, LL kept his original verse. When Canibus' original verse leaked, a feud started between the two rappers. LL suggested the two make a song together to squash the beef after he was done filming Any Given Sunday, Canibus, however, recorded and released "Second Round K.O." instead. LL would respond with "The Ripper Strikes Back" and "Back Where I Belong" and even thanked Canibus in the liner notes of his album G.O.A.T. for "inspiration". In the song, Canibus says "the greatest rapper of all time died on March 9.", in reference to The Notorious B.I.G., who died on March 9, 1997. Canibus followed up his diss 1 year later, with a record entitled "Rip the Jacker", over a polished remake of the beat from LL Cool J's "I'm Bad".

Track listings
CD single
"Second Round K.O." (LP Version) - 4:02 
"Second Round K.O." (Clean) - 4:02 
"Second Round K.O." (Instrumental) - 3:53 
"How We Roll" (LP version) - 4:17
"How We Roll" (Clean) - 4:18

12" single
Side A
"Second Round K.O." (Main) - 4:02 
"Second Round K.O." (Album version) - 4:02

Side B
"How We Roll" (Main version) - 4:17 
"How We Roll" (Clean) - 4:18

Charts

Weekly charts

Year-end charts

See also
List of notable diss tracks

References

1997 songs
1998 debut singles
Canibus songs
Song recordings produced by Wyclef Jean
LL Cool J
Diss tracks